Duh Darrehsi (also Romanized as Dūh Darrehsī) is a village in Qeshlaq-e Gharbi Rural District, Aslan Duz District, Parsabad County, Ardabil Province, Iran. At the 2006 census, its population was 53, in 9 families.

References 

Towns and villages in Parsabad County